The 1997 Duke Blue Devils football team represented the Duke University in the 1997 NCAA Division I-A football season. The team participated as members of the Atlantic Coast Conference. They played their homes games at Wallace Wade Stadium in Durham, North Carolina. The team was led by head coach Fred Goldsmith.

Schedule

References

Duke
Duke Blue Devils football seasons
Duke Blue Devils football